Cherkasovka is a rural locality (a selo) in Yerkovetsky Selsoviet of Ivanovsky District, Amur Oblast, Russia. The population was 33 as of 2018. There are 2 streets.

Geography 
Cherkasovka is located on the left bank of the Kozlovka River, 47 km east of Ivanovka (the district's administrative centre) by road. Preobrazhenovka is the nearest rural locality.

References 

Rural localities in Ivanovsky District, Amur Oblast